Brzozowo-Chabdy  is a village in the administrative district of Gmina Poświętne, within Białystok County, Podlaskie Voivodeship, in north-eastern Poland.

References

Brzozowo-Chabdy